Non-effective conjugation is the phenomenon of meiotic chromosome pairing without chiasmata, including the absence of crossing over.  When this meiosis occurs during gametogenesis, it is commonly limited to one of the two sexes.  The most frequent feature of such meiosis is the absence any opening-out of the homologues chromosomes in diakinesis.  The four bivalent chromatide  are staying parallel until the beginning of the metaphase.
 
Non-effective conjugation is a distinct and specific mechanism that occurs independently in numerous organisms and species. It is rare in higher plants, and not registered in vertebrates.

References

Cytogenetics
Classical genetics
Meiosis